O. P. Schnabel Park is a  city park in the City of San Antonio, Texas (located at 9600 Bandera Road). The park includes buildings for the YMCA program, ball fields, a basketball court, and several trails. Formerly known as Bandera Road Park, the park was named O.P. Schnabel Park in 1977.

History

The park land was purchased by the city of San Antonio in 1964. It was originally simply named 'Bandera Road Park'. Throughout the park there are oak trees and mountain laurels.

The park was renamed after O.P. Schnabel in 1977, known in the area for his efforts to improve the visual appeal of San Antonio through several "clean-up and beautification campaigns". The park is sometimes referred to as "the cleanest little park in Texas".

Facilities

The park has water fountains, restrooms, picnic areas and pavilions, and a basketball court. There are also 4.5 miles of trails which can be used for jogging, hiking, or biking. Trail markers indicate level of difficulty and accessibility. Pets on leashes are allowed. At least two walking trails are wheelchair accessible.

References

External links 
 O. P. Schnabel Park's history
 San Antonio Trails
 O.P. Schnabel Park Trails
 O.P. Schnabel Park Facility Reservations
 O.P. Schnabel Park

Parks in San Antonio
Protected areas of Bexar County, Texas
Tourist attractions in San Antonio
1964 establishments in Texas
Protected areas established in 1964